Hawkes Ocean Technologies is a marine engineering firm that specializes in consumer submarines, founded by Graham Hawkes. It is headquartered in San Francisco, US.

Hawkes Remotes

Hawkes Remotes is a subsidiary that builds ROVs (remotely operated vehicles), unmanned robotic submarines.

DeepFlight

Hawkes builds the DeepFlight range of submersibles, which uses hydrodynamic forces for diving, instead of ballast. The subs are all-electric. All or some of them have two pairs of wings like an airplane's, one pair front and the other pair rear, shorter than an airplane's and the other way up so they push the submarine down.

DeepFlight submersibles
 DeepFlight I
 DeepFlight I was sponsored by TV firms, and serve as technology testbed for DeepFlight II.
 Wet Flight 
 Wet Flight was used in filming of "Dolphins: The Ride"/
 DeepFlight II
 DeepFlight II was designed on AutoCAD.
 DeepFlight Aviator
 With an operational depth of 1500ft, the Aviator is the first of its kind positively-buoyant submersible. It relies solely on hydrodynamic forces to dive. It was designed completely on a computer.
 DeepFlight Challenger
 The Challenger was designed for Steve Fossett's attempt at the world's deepest point, Challenger Deep.
 DeepFlight Super Falcon
 The SuperFalcon is much more maneuverable than all subs preceding it. Unlike most subs, it does not have a circular pressure hull. The first example was built for Tom Perkins.  At the time of launch, it was the most advanced personal submarine in the world.
 DeepFlight Merlin 
 The initial example is called Necker Nymph and run by Virgin Limited Edition.
 DeepFlight Dragon

Other submersibles 

 Deep Rover, a series of 1- and 2-seater subs that relied on conventional ballast systems for diving, designed by Hawkes, built by Deep Ocean Engineering. — Some of the 2-seaters were used on the documentary film "Aliens of the Deep". This submarine design set the former world solo dive depth record in 1985 at 1000m.
 Deep Rover I
 Deep Rover II — Deep Rover II was used in the Michael Crichton film "Sphere".
 Mantis (submersible), a one-man deep sea engineering sub designed by Hawkes, built by OSEL. — Mantis was used in the James Bond film "For Your Eyes Only".
 Wasp (diving suit), an atmospheric diving suit for deep sea engineering designed by Hawkes, built by OSEL.

References

Citations

External links
 Hawkes Ocean Technologies DeepFlight Submersibles

Marine engineering organizations
Shipbuilding companies of California
Submarines
Companies based in San Francisco